Bishop Emeritus T. S. Kanaka Prasad was the sixth successor of Frank Whittaker and seventh Bishop–in–Medak for the Diocese of Medak of the Church of South India (CSI) during the period 2009–2012.

Ministerial formation
During the bishopric of H. D. L. Abraham, Kanaka Prasad entered the priesthood and studied spirituality in ecclesiastical institutions in Andhra Pradesh and Telangana.

Andhra Pradesh

Ramayapatnam
Kanaka Prasad first underwent a year of propadeutic studies at the STBC-Ramayapatnam Baptist Theological College in Ramayapatnam in Nellore district during the principalship of Louis F. Knoll where he was also taught by the Old Testament scholar, G. Solomon and the Church historian R. Joseph.

Rajahmundry
After a year of study at Ramayapatnam, Kanaka Prasad moved to the Andhra Christian Theological College then located at Rajahmundry where he enrolled for spiritual studies during the principalship of W. D. Coleman and studied under notable faculty including G. Devasahayam, W. P. Peery, G. Solomon, M. Victor Paul, S. Joseph, Victor Premasagar, B. E. Devaraj, Eric J. Lott, Muriel Spurgeon Carder and Waldo Penner.

Telangana
Kanaka Prasad then studied at the Andhra Christian Theological College, which by then had moved to Hyderabad, during the period of the Old Testament scholars, Victor Premasagar, CSI and G. Babu Rao, CBCNC.

Bishopric
When B. P. Sugandhar retired from the bishopric, T. S. Kanaka Prasad contested the vacant bishopric and was elected as the eighth Bishop in Medak and consecrated on 17 August 2009 at the CSI-Medak Cathedral by then Moderator, The Most Reverend John Wilson Gladstone, the principal consecrator and The Right Reverend Christopher Asir, the co-consecrator in the presence of bishops including S. J. Theodore, Bishop - in - Karimnagar, P. J. Lawrence Bishop - in - Nandyal and others as well as clergy from the Diocese of Medak led by A. C. Solomon Raj, who succeeded Kanaka Prasad to the bishopric of Medak.

References

Further reading
 
 
 
 

Living people
Telugu people
Anglican bishops of Medak
People from Medak
Senate of Serampore College (University) alumni
1950 births
Church of South India clergy